Pano Dikomo is a village in Cyprus, located about halfway between Nicosia and Kyrenia. De facto, it is under the control of Northern Cyprus. According to Northern Cyprus, Pano Dikomo is part of Dikomo.

References 

Communities in Kyrenia District
Populated places in Girne District